Tang Bacheyie (born March 25, 1985) is a former professional Canadian football safety. He last played for the Toronto Argonauts of the Canadian Football League. He was drafted by the BC Lions in the fourth round of the 2009 CFL Draft. He played college football for the Kansas Jayhawks.

On July 22, 2009, Bacheyie was acquired by the Toronto Argonauts from the Lions' practice roster. On July 31, 2009, Bacheyie was released by the Argonauts, but re-signed with them on January 12, 2010. He was again released on June 1, 2011.

References

External links
Toronto Argonauts bio

1985 births
Living people
BC Lions players
Canadian football defensive backs
Kansas Jayhawks football players
Players of Canadian football from Ontario
Sportspeople from Windsor, Ontario